"Sending My Love" is a song by American R&B group Zhané recorded for their debut album, Pronounced Jah-Nay (1994). It was released as the album's third single on May 23, 1994. The remixes can be viewed on YouTube.

In November 2020, American duo Chloe x Halle covered the song as an exclusive Spotify release.

Release and reception
Jose F. Promis at AllMusic called "Sending My Love" a "glorious, elegant, and sleek" song. Larry Flick from Billboard wrote, "This infectious third single, produced by Naughty By Nature, proves that the duo is likely to be around a while. Here the twosome offers more of its fine- tuned, trademark blend of subtle groove textures, smooth vocals, and sweet harmonies. It's a winning formula pronounced, simply, "hit"." Bill Speed and John Martinucci from the Gavin Report commented, "Yes! Yes! Yes! This is THE jam. (...) With "Sending My Love", Zhane delivers another radio-friendly groove thang." Ralph Tee from Music Weeks RM Dance Update deemed it "a light chirpy tune with floating vocals and keyboards together with a chunky two-step bassline." He added, "Not as instant as the last couple of singles, and without a familiar breakbeat to help it along, this is unlikely to be the track that sets them up for the big time but it's still this week's most firing import. Best stick one away as this is exactly the sort of tune that comes back around just when you can't get it anymore."

Music video
The song's accompanying music video was directed by American film director, producer and actor Antoine Fuqua.

Track listings
 CD single and 12", vinyl"Sending My Love" (Sticky Stamp Mix) - 3:57
"Sending My Love" (OG Bass Edit) - 3:43
"Sending My Love" (S.I.D.'s Mix) - 4:23
"Sending My Love" (Al's Mix) - 6:05
"Sending My Love" (LP Version) - 3:42

 12", vinyl (promo)'
"Sending My Love" (Sticky Stamp Mix) - 3:57
"Sending My Love" (OG Bass Edit) - 3:43
"Sending My Love" (S.I.D.'s Mix) - 4:23
"Sending My Love" (Al's Edit) - 4:15
"Sending My Love" (Acapella) - 3:01
"Sending My Love" (LP Version) - 3:42
"Sending My Love" (Al's Mix) - 6:05
"Sending My Love" (Lovestrumental) - 3:56
"Sending My Love" (Sunra Hip Hop Edit) - 4:00

Personnel
Information taken from Discogs.
additional production – Cedeño, Larry Robinson, Soulfinga
production – Naughty by Nature
remixing – Cedeño, Al "Baby Jesus" Eaton, Larry Robinson, S.I.D., Soulfinga
writing – Naughty by Nature, Renee A. Neufville

Charts

Weekly charts

Year-end charts

Notes

1994 singles
Motown singles
Zhané songs
Songs about letters (message)
Song recordings produced by Naughty by Nature
Songs written by Erick Sermon
Songs written by Treach
Songs written by KayGee
Songs written by Vin Rock
1994 songs
Music videos directed by Antoine Fuqua
Contemporary R&B ballads
1990s ballads